Tillit Sidney Teddlie (June 3, 1885 – August 17, 1987) was a singing school teacher, composer, publisher, and minister of the Church of Christ.

Teddlie was born June 3, 1885, at Swan, Texas (Smith County), the son of Theodore and Sarah Ann (Porter) Teddlie. In 1903, he was baptized into Christ, and also taught his first shape note singing school, which lasted for two weeks. He composed his first song in 1906. During his lifetime, Teddlie taught singing schools for 61 years, composed 130 songs, published 14 song books, and served as a full-time evangelist, including preaching for the Johnson Street Church of Christ (1945–1951) and Central Church of Christ in Greenville, Texas, and Churches of Christ in Ennis, Sulphur Springs, Lone Oak and Quinlan.

Personal life and death
Tillit S. Teddlie married Edna Webb (1880-1959). They had one son, Pete. Teddlie died on August 17, 1987 in Gunter, Texas, aged 102. He is buried in the Forest Park Cemetery at Greenville, Texas. Upon his grave stone is inscribed the title of one of his most popular hymns - "Heaven Holds All To Me".

Titles of some of Teddlie's songs

A Joyful Song
Be Not Anxious
Cast All Your Burdens on The Lord
Don't Wait Too Long
God Sent His Own Son
Hear Me When I Call
Heaven Holds All To Me
I Remember Jesus
In Heaven They're Singing
In The Service of My King
May This My Glory Be
O God of Infinite Mercy
O the Depth and the Riches
Oft We Come Together, "True Worship"
Round the Hills in Galilee
Safe In The Harbor
Singing Redemption's Song
Songs of Salvation
Swiftly We're Turning
The Master's Touch
Thou Wilt Keep Him
Time Enough Yet
We Shall Meet Someday
What Will Your Answer Be?
When We Meet In Sweet Communion, "The Lord's Supper"
Worthy Art Thou
You Can Lead Someone To Jesus

Heaven Holds All to Me
Teddlie was a member of and ministered in the churches of Christ, but many of his songs reached popular circulation among Christians of the denominations, especially through the Stamps-Baxter Music Company. Two of his best known are "What Will Your Answer Be?" (1935) and "Heaven Holds All to Me" (1932).

External links

Tillit S. Teddlie - from Cyber Hymnal
Biography of Tillit S. Teddlie with a partial listing of his songs

1885 births
1987 deaths
American centenarians
Men centenarians
People from Tyler, Texas
People from Smith County, Texas
Christian hymnwriters
American Christian hymnwriters
Ministers of the Churches of Christ
American members of the Churches of Christ
Shape note
20th-century American male singers
20th-century American singers